State Trunk Highway 213 (often called Highway 213, STH-213 or WIS 213) is a state highway in the U.S. state of Wisconsin. It runs north–south in south central Wisconsin from Beloit to Evansville.

History
WIS 213 was designated in 1961 for a segment formerly a part of WIS 13 south of Evansville when WIS 13 was truncated to end in the Wisconsin Dells area. Later in 1961, WIS 213 was extended southerly from its terminus at WIS 81 to end at WIS 15. In 1988, Interstate 43 (I-43) replaced WIS 15, and WIS 213 was extended to the state line.

Major intersections

See also

References

External links

213
Transportation in Rock County, Wisconsin